SI derived units are units of measurement derived from the
seven base units specified by the International System of Units (SI). They can be expressed as a product (or ratio) of one or more of the base units, possibly scaled by an appropriate power of exponentiation (see: Buckingham π theorem). Some are dimensionless, as when the units cancel out in ratios of like quantities.

The SI has special names for 22 of these derived units (for example, hertz, the SI unit of measurement of frequency), but the rest merely reflect their derivation: for example, the square metre (m2), the SI derived unit of area; and the kilogram per cubic metre (kg/m3 or kg⋅m−3), the SI derived unit of density. 

The names of SI derived units, when written in full, are always in lowercase. However, the symbols for units named after persons are written with an uppercase initial letter. For example, the symbol for hertz is "Hz", while the symbol for metre is "m".

Special names
The International System of Units assigns special names to 22 derived units, which includes two dimensionless derived units, the radian (rad) and the steradian (sr).

Examples of derived quantities and units

Other units used with SI
Some other units such as the hour, litre, tonne, bar, and electronvolt are not SI units, but are widely used in conjunction with SI units.

Supplementary units
Until 1995, the SI classified the radian and the steradian as supplementary units, but this designation was abandoned and the units were grouped as derived units.

See also
 List of physical quantities
 International System of Quantities (ISQ)
 International Vocabulary of Metrology
 Metric prefix
 Metric system

References

Bibliography

External links

Derived
 

sv:SI-enhet#Härledda enheter